Dermot Drummy (16 January 1961 – 27 November 2017) was an English football coach and professional player. He was the  head coach of Crawley Town, a position he took up in April 2016 after serving three years as manager of the Chelsea reserves and two years as the youth team manager.

Drummy died by suicide at the age of 56 in November 2017.

Club career
Drummy, who played as a midfielder, began his career with the youth team at Arsenal. He never made the first team at Arsenal, but did make five appearances in the Football League on loan at Blackpool. He later played non-league football for Hendon, Wealdstone, Enfield,  Ware and St Albans City. While at Hendon, Drummy scored in the final of the 1988 Middlesex Senior Charity Cup where Hendon were crowned champions.

Coaching career
Drummy was player-manager at Ware during the 1996–97 season. He left halfway through to become a youth coach at Arsenal, before becoming manager of the Chelsea Academy in January 2009. The academy won the 2009–10 FA Youth Cup in his second year in charge, beating the Aston Villa Academy 3–2 on aggregate – the academy's first Youth Cup victory in 49 years. After a successful spell managing the youth team, Drummy was appointed reserve team manager in July 2011, replacing Steve Holland who went on to work with the first team.

For the 2012–13 season the old reserve team league was replaced by a new under-21 format, with Drummy taking control of that squad, as well as an under-19 team that competed in a European competition – the NextGen Series. The final of that was reached with Barcelona, Ajax, Juventus and Arsenal beaten along the way, before defeat to Aston Villa in a match held in Italy. In the 2013–14 season, Drummy won the Under-21 Premier League.

Drummy moved to the role of international head coach in June 2014.

In June 2015, Drummy was offered the manager's job at Brazilian side Bangu.

He became head coach of Crawley Town in April 2016. He left in May 2017.

Death
Drummy died at the age of 56 in November 2017. The cause of death was announced on 5 April 2018 as suicide.

Managerial statistics

References

External links
Former Staff - Dermot Drummy Hendon FC
Dermot Drummy Statistics St Albans City FC

1961 births
2017 deaths
Footballers from the London Borough of Hackney
English footballers
Association football midfielders
Arsenal F.C. players
Blackpool F.C. players
Hendon F.C. players
Wealdstone F.C. players
Enfield F.C. players
Ware F.C. players
St Albans City F.C. players
English Football League players
English football managers
Crawley Town F.C. managers
English Football League managers
Arsenal F.C. non-playing staff
Chelsea F.C. non-playing staff
Suicides in England
2017 suicides